Guy Patrick Sularz (born November 7, 1955) is a former infielder in Major League Baseball. He played for the San Francisco Giants.

After Sularz's playing career ended, he became a firefighter in Phoenix, Arizona.

References

External links

1955 births
Living people
Baseball players from Minneapolis
Fresno Giants players
Major League Baseball infielders
Great Falls Giants players
Phoenix Giants players
San Francisco Giants players
Sun City Rays players
Waterbury Giants players
North Hollywood High School alumni